Dong Zhen (born 27 August 1986) is a Chinese singer-songwriter and lyricist best known for performing the theme songs of many Chinese MMORPGs, including The Legend of Sword and Fairy series, Jade Dynasty and Zu Online.

Career
Dong graduated from the Communication University of China. After her graduation, she went to pursue her career as a singer with the Beijing Musical Organisation. In 2006, Dong was a judge at the auditions of the Woxing Woxiu reality television show, jointly organised by UMG and SMG. She also participated in the 2009 Super Girl (2009快樂女聲) contest and was one of the top 300 finalists from all over China.

Dong is best known for performing the theme songs of several Chinese MMORPGs, including The Legend of Sword and Fairy series, Jade Dynasty and Zu Online, as well as for some television series and commercials. She is the first singer to use the Zhongguo Feng style (a form of modern Chinese music which fuses traditional instruments and styles with R&B or rock) for theme songs from video games. Dong also writes lyrics for songs by other singers, including Jang Na-ra and Jeong Jae-yeon. She released a total of six albums from 2007 to 2011.

Discography

Albums

Zhen Ai Yi Hui

Tui Bian

Diao Hua Long

Fan Pu Gui Zhen

Zhen Jiang Hu

Jiu Yin Zhen Jing

Original singles

Vocals

Duets

Non original singles

Notes

External links
  Dong Zhen's official website
  Dong Zhen's blog on Sina.com

1986 births
Living people
21st-century Chinese women singers
Chinese women singer-songwriters
Chinese lyricists
Chinese pop singers
Communication University of China alumni
Mandopop singer-songwriters
People from Sanming
Singers from Fujian